Hausma is a village in Hiiumaa Parish, Hiiu County in northwestern Estonia.

The village is first mentioned in 1564 (Hakelax). Historically, the village was part of Suuremõisa Manor.

The village's eastern part is named as Heilu. Before 1940s Heilu was a standalone village.

References
 

Villages in Hiiu County